Hilda Shapiro Thorpe (1919–2000) was an American sculptor and painter. Thorpe taught a generation of metro Washington, D.C. artists.

Life
Thorpe was born Hilda Gottlieb on December 1, 1919, in Baltimore. She was a prolific artist who did not start working professionally until she was nearly 40 and had raised three children.

Thorpe made sculpture from materials such as sheet metal, gauze, balsa wood and handmade paper painted with shimmering fields of color.  Thorpe carried on the proud tradition of the Washington Color School.

Thorpe was influenced by her peers of the time, including the six artists in The Washington Color School: Morris Louis, Kenneth Noland, Gene Davis, Howard Mehring, Thomas "Tom" Downing, Paul Reed. In July 1997 Thorpe was interviewed for a special Creative Vision documentary by Barbara Januszkiewicz.

Further reading

References

Sources
 Elizabeth Tebow Hilda Thorpe: sculpture, paperwork, painting, 1963-1988, Athenaeum, Northern Virginia Fine Arts Association (Alexandria, Va), 1988
 "Hilda Thorpe, in her own words", Washington Review Volume XXVI No.June 1/July 2000 *"Hilda Thorpe, in her own words", Washington Review Volume XXVI No.June 1/July 2000

External links
 
 Idealist
 Creative Visions: A Multimedia Collaboration - Gallery West - Absolutearts.com

20th-century American painters
1919 births
2000 deaths
20th-century American sculptors